Erica erigena, the Irish heath, is a species of flowering plant in the family Ericaceae, native to cliffs and heathland in Ireland, southwestern France, Spain, Portugal and Tangier. Its appearance in the far west of Ireland, separated from the main Mediterranean populations, suggests a garden escape.

The leaves are 4-whorled, measuring 5 - 8 mm in length and turning dark green at maturity.

In cultivation, it is often seen as groundcover amongst dwarf conifers.  Like others of its kind, it is a calcifuge, preferring an open sunny site with well-drained acid soil. Numerous cultivars have been developed for garden use, of which the following have gained the Royal Horticultural Society's Award of Garden Merit: 
Erica erigena 'Irish Dusk' 
Erica erigena f. alba 'W.T. Rackliff' (white-flowered)

References

erigena